This is a list of wars and conflicts involving Guyana from the Colonial era to the Modern era.

Cassard expedition (1712)
Berbice slave uprising (1763–1764)
Fourth Anglo-Dutch War (1780)
Demerara rebellion of 1823
World War II (1939–1945)
Rupununi Uprising (1969)

Guyana
Wars